Joe Lea (born 16 December 1997) is an English professional footballer who plays for Gosport Borough, as a midfielder.

Career

Southampton
Born in Portsmouth, Lea signed for his local side Portsmouth as a youngster before moving to south-coast rivals Southampton at the age of 9. Lea spent nine years in the Southampton youth academy before being released upon the completion of his two-year scholarship.

Yeovil Town
Upon his release from Southampton, Lea joined Yeovil Town on 2 July 2016, alongside Josh Ezewele from West Bromwich Albion. He made his professional debut on 23 August 2016 as a substitute in a League Cup match at Everton.

On 15 October 2016, Lea joined Southern Premier League side Dorchester Town on an initial one-month loan deal, and Lea made his debut for Dorchester that afternoon as a second-half substitute against Dunstable Town.

In January 2017, Lea joined National League South side Gosport Borough on loan until the end of the season.

At the end of the 2016–17 season, Lea was released by Yeovil having only made two appearances for the club.

Bognor Regis Town
After a successful trial, Lea signed for newly promoted National League South club Bognor Regis Town in July 2017.

Gosport Borough
Lea signed for Gosport Borough on 18 January 2018.

Career statistics

References

1997 births
Living people
Footballers from Portsmouth
English footballers
Portsmouth F.C. players
Southampton F.C. players
Yeovil Town F.C. players
Dorchester Town F.C. players
Gosport Borough F.C. players
Bognor Regis Town F.C. players
National League (English football) players
Association football midfielders